Nadia Eke (born 11 January 1993, Accra) is a Ghanaian triple jumper.

Education 
Eke graduated from Columbia University in 2015.

Career 
In 2014, she finished tenth at the Commonwealth Games in Glasgow, won silver at the African Championships in Marrakech and was seventh at the IAAF Continental Cup.

She also won bronze at the African Games in Brazzaville in 2015. In 2016, she became African champion during the 2016 African Athletics Championship. 

She qualified to represent Ghana at the 2020 Summer Olympics in the Women's triple jump event.

Personal bests
Outdoor
 Triple jump – 14.33m, June 2019, Jamaica (Ghanaian record)
Indoor
 Triple jump – 13.60m, 14 January 2017, New York City

References

External links 
 

1993 births
Living people
Ghanaian female triple jumpers
Athletes (track and field) at the 2014 Commonwealth Games
Athletes (track and field) at the 2018 Commonwealth Games
Commonwealth Games competitors for Ghana
African Games bronze medalists for Ghana
African Games medalists in athletics (track and field)
Athletes (track and field) at the 2015 African Games

Columbia Lions women's track and field athletes
Columbia College (New York) alumni
Athletes (track and field) at the 2020 Summer Olympics
Olympic athletes of Ghana
20th-century Ghanaian women
21st-century Ghanaian women